The Valley View Bridge is a trio of steel multi-stringer highway girder bridges that carry Interstate 480 over the Cuyahoga River valley in Valley View and Independence, Ohio.

History
 The bridges opened in 1977 providing access to the nearby Willow Freeway (I-77).

In 1999, the Ohio Department of Transportation painted the bridge a red-primer color, replacing the original gray.

In 2010, the bridge received the honorary name "Union Workers Memorial Bridge".

In 2011, ODOT will begin a project to retrofit the bridge's parapets. The work includes installing new fences and moving the overhead lighting to the outside of the structures. The estimated cost of construction is $4.4 million.

In 2016, ODOT announced that a third bridge would be built in between the two outer bridges, which then would undergo extended repairs. The third bridge, whose construction was from 2018 to 2020, will be retained after the bridge replacement phase ends in 2022, creating a bypass of the interchanges on each end of the bridge, functioning as express lanes; the project as a whole is expected to run until 2024.

A pair of peregrine falcons nests under the bridge.

Accidents
The city of Valley View has jurisdiction over the bridge, and they have been assisted by the police and fire departments from Garfield Heights and Independence.

On February 17, 1986, a driver was rescued when his semi-truck partially left the bridge.
In February 1996, a car fell from the bridge, killing the driver.
In March 1997, police and the fire department responded to a dangling semi-truck. The driver was safely rescued.
On February 22, 2011, a semi-truck driver was killed when his cab fell off the bridge.
On June 25, 2013, during a severe storm, a couple of highway signs fell down hitting two cars and injuring one person.
On December 14, 2017, while attempting to elude police, a man drove down the steep embankment that separates the two spans of the bridge.

See also
 
 
 
 List of crossings of the Cuyahoga River
 List of bridges in the United States by height

References

External links

Bridges on the Interstate Highway System
Bridges over the Cuyahoga River
Road bridges in Ohio
Interstate 80
Steel bridges in the United States
Girder bridges in the United States
Transportation buildings and structures in Cuyahoga County, Ohio